Ordynsky District is an administrative and municipal district (raion), one of the thirty in Novosibirsk Oblast, Russia. It is located in the southeast of the oblast. Its administrative center is the urban locality (a work settlement) of Ordynskoye. Population: 36,708 (2010 Census);  The population of Ordynskoye accounts for 27.9% of the district's total population.

Notable residents 

Vyacheslav Larents (born 1994 in Verkh-Irmen), footballer

References

Notes

Sources

Districts of Novosibirsk Oblast